System Capital Management or SCM is a major Ukrainian financial and industrial holding company which was established in Donetsk in the east of the country. Since 2014, the company has been headquartered in Kyiv.  The business is controlled by a Ukrainian oligarch Rinat Akhmetov who owns 100% of the company shares.  In 2010, the group has revenues of around $12.8 billion and has assets worth over $22.7 billion.

SCM Holding
 System Capital Management
 SCM Advisors (UK)

List of assets
 Metinvest holding (mining metallurgical complex)
 DTEK (energy engineering)
 Corum Group (machine building)
 (banking and insurance finance services)
 First Ukrainian International Bank (PUMB)
 ASKA
 ASKA-Zhyttia
 Vega telecom (telecommunications)
 ESTA Holding (real estate)
Donbass Palace (Donetsk)
 Opera boutique hotel (Kiev)
 Central Department store (Kiev)
 Trading chambers in Ukraine, Russia, Kazakhstan
 United Minerals Group (UMG, clay mining)
 Druzhkivka Quarry (Druzhkivka Ore Administration)
 VESKO
 Ogneupornerud (Fire Resistance non-Ore)
 Portinvest (Marine transportation, www.portinvest.com.ua)
 HarvEast Holding (agricultural business)
 Shakhtar Donetsk (football)
 Donbass Arena

Former assets
In July 2022 SCM Group owner and Ukrainian oligarch Rinat Akhmetov renounced his media assets due to an anti-oligarch law.
 Ukraina Media Group (media-business)
Ukrayina TV channel
 Football 1 TV channel
 Football 2 TV channel
 Donbas TV channel
 OLL.TV internet
 Digital screens
 NLO TV
Segodnya Multimedia Publishing Group
 Today Multimedia
 segodnya.ua

Related companies
 Lemtrans (Rail transportation)
 Dokuchayevsk Flux and Dolomite Combine
 Kryvbas Explosive Industries
 Novotroitsk Ore Administration

References 

Lists of corporate subsidiaries
Companies of Ukraine
SCM Holdings